Watadeniya is a village in Sri Lanka, located within the Kandy District in the country's Central Province. It is served by the B091 (Daulagala-Watadeniya) and B172 (Kadugannawa-Gampola) roads.

See also
List of towns in Central Province, Sri Lanka

Populated places in Kandy District